Ekati Airport  is located at the Ekati Diamond Mine, Northwest Territories, Canada and is operated by Arctic Canadian Diamond Company Prior permission is required to land except in the case of an emergency. It is a busy  aerodrome with blasting in the area and barren-ground caribou may be found on the runway.

References

External links

Registered aerodromes in the North Slave Region